Chirona is a genus of acorn barnacles in the family Balanidae. There are about six described species in Chirona.

Species
These species belong to the genus Chirona:
 Chirona evermanni (Pilsbry, 1907)
 Chirona hameri (Ascanius, 1767)
 Chirona sublaevis (Sowerby, 1840)
 Chirona varians (Sowerby, 1846)
 † Chirona bimanicus (Withers, 1923)
 † Chirona unguiformis (Sowerby, 1846)

References

External links

 

Barnacles